Martin Hlaváček is a Czech politician who was elected as a Member of the European Parliament in 2019.

References

1980 births
Living people
Politicians from Prague
MEPs for the Czech Republic 2019–2024
ANO 2011 MEPs
ANO 2011 politicians
Czech University of Life Sciences Prague alumni